Chit A Mhya is a 1940 Burmese black-and-white drama film, directed by Tin Maung starring Tin Maung, May Shin and May Myint. It is the first sound film of A1 Film Company. It was based on the 1938 American film The Toy Wife.

Cast
Tin Maung as Tin Oo
May Shin as Khin Khin Tint
May Myint as Khin Khin Myint
Bo Thaung as U Bo Thaung
Saing Tin as Saing Tin

References

1940 films
Burmese-language films
Films shot in Myanmar
Burmese black-and-white films